15 Again is the third album by French electronic duo Cassius, released in 11 September 2006 by EMI Records and Virgin Records. It was released in the United States by Astralwerks in 2007.

Writing, recording and production 

The album was written and produced by Cassius members Phillippe Zdar and Boombass and was recorded in three weeks in Ibiza. It includes a collaboration with hip hop producer and performer Pharrell Williams. Other collaborators include Sébastien Tellier, -M-, Etienne de Crécy and Le Knight Club (electronic duo composed of Guy-Manuel de Homem-Christo and Eric Chedeville).

Critical reception 

Metacritic, which assigns a normalised rating out of 100 to reviews from mainstream critics, reported an average score of 84 based on 6 reviews, described as "universal acclaim". Entertainment Weekly describes the album production as, "pair[ing] fuzzy beats with sleek, Steely Dan-inspired, soft-rock stylings."

Track listing

US version 
The US version released by HBF/Justice replaces "Cria Cuervos" with "Shame Shame Chérie" in a slightly different order:

Charts

References 

2006 albums
Cassius (band) albums
EMI Records albums